This is the complete discography of the main 12-inch (8000) series of LPs issued by Verve Records, a label founded in 1956 by producer Norman Granz in Los Angeles, California. Alongside new sessions Granz re-released many of  the recordings of his earlier labels Clef and Norgran on Verve.

The primal sessions issued on Verve were one of Charlie Parker with Lester Young performing "Lady Be Good" (8002, 8840), and of the Gene Krupa Trio (8031, licensed to Mercury beforehand) both at the "Philharmonic Auditorium" in Los Angeles, on January 28, 1946. In April that year a Jazz Recital with Billie Holiday was recorded, previously a Clef album, now reissued on the new label. And a former Norgram issue of a radio broadcast capturing a rare trio formation consisting of Lester Young, Nat King Cole and Buddy Rich. The incessant matching of musicians of different generations and schools is strongly associated with Norman Granz whose long-lasting Jazz at the Philharmonic concert project was also part of his work as a record producer. Although JATP concerts appear here, some are not listed here; they were issued in the MG VOL 1-11 sequence, which is not part of this discography, as much as the 78 rpm and 45 rpm LP and single series. Other JATP concerts first appeared on Granz later Pablo Records label, which also reissued the Art Tatum recordings listed below which he had reacquired. Also absent is the Down Home series dedicated to documenting surviving early jazz players and revivalists.

Beside the already mentioned musicians the Verve catalog comprised a good share of prominent jazz musicians of the 1940s to '60s, featuring Count Basie, Woody Herman, and Lionel Hampton. The 4000 series was dedicated to projects involving Ella Fitzgerald is not listed here (but is partially included on her discography page), nor is the 2000 series dedicated to other singers including Anita O'Day, although some of these were later reissued in the 8000 series.

After Norman Granz sold Verve to MGM in 1961, Creed Taylor was designated as producer for the label. He followed a more commercial policy, including the successful Bossa Nova albums of Stan Getz, but Taylor left five years later. Other younger musicians such as Bill Evans, Wes Montgomery, Gerry Mulligan and Jimmy Smith recorded extensively for the label during this period. Verve Folkways (see Verve Forecast) established by Taylor as a subsidiary is not tabulated here either. However, Frank Zappa's Lumpy Gravy (8741), and an album by Alan Lorber (8711) are to be found here. The most recent recordings issued (and listed here) date from 1973, with organist Jimmy Smith accompanied by an orchestra under Thad Jones (8832), and Casting Pearls by the blues-rock formation Mill Valley Bunch (8825).

DiscographyDiscography of the Verve, Clef, Down Home and Norgran labels, accessed December 10, 2015

8000 Jazz Series
The Verve 8000 Jazz Series of LP Records commenced in 1956 with reissues of Clef and Norgran material but soon progressed to issuing new recordings by artists that included Count Basie, Louis Bellson, Dizzy Gillespie, Sonny Stitt, Johnny Hodges, Ben Webster, Lester Young and others. The series features several best-selling and influential jazz albums such as Oscar Peterson's Night Train (1963) and Stan Getz and João Gilberto's Getz/Gilberto (1964) which included "The Girl from Ipanema". The series initially used a catalog number prefix MGV but converted to V/V6 after the label was sold to MGM in 1961 when mono and stereo versions were released simultaneously with the same number. The prefix MGV (mono) was used until 8398, some titles were issued in the MGVS (stereo) 6000 series during 1959–60. Following the change of ownership, after a brief period when a new prefix V/V6 was also used (8399-8407), it entirely superseded the earlier practice. Later issues of earlier titles used the new prefix with 8000 numbers regardless of the mono/stereo distinction (the 6000 series was dropped). The series concluded in 1974. 
Numbers not appearing were not used for any issue (63 in total).

References

Discographies of American record labels